The Nathan Reingold Prize (formerly Ida & Henry Schuman Prize) is given every year to a graduate student for having written an original essay in the history of science. It is awarded by the History of Science Society.

References

American awards
History of science awards